Vanda richardsiana is a species of epiphytic orchid native to China South-Central. It differs in the spur length from Vanda falcata. Some authors dispute this species status and regard it as a subspecies of Vanda falcata. Dr. Martin Motes argues against effective isolating mechanisms of the length of the spur. Accorting to Motes, the variation of this characteristic easily falls within a species range of variation and further research might reduce it to a varietal status.

Description
The morphology closely resembles Vanda falcata, however the spur is significantly shorter.

Conservation
Like all orchids, it is protected unter the CITES appendix II regulations of international trade.

References

richardsiana
Orchids of China